Samuel Trehawke Kekewich (31 October 1796 – 1 June 1873) was an English Tory and later Conservative Party politician who sat in the House of Commons from 1826 to 1830 and from 1858 to 1873.

Kekewich was the son of Samuel Kekewich of Peamore Exeter and his wife Salome Sweet, daughter of George Sweet of Tiverton. He was educated at Eton College and Christ Church, Oxford. He was a Deputy Lieutenant and J.P. for Devon.

In 1826, Kekewich was elected unopposed at a by-election as a Member of Parliament (MP) for Exeter, and held the seat until 1830. In 1835 he was High Sheriff of Devon. He stood for parliament unsuccessfully at Liskeard in the 1835 and 1837 general elections. In August 1858, he was elected at an unopposed by-election as an MP for South Devon. He held the seat until his death in 1873. He was chairman of the visitors of the lunatic asylum and chairman of the board of guardians at St Thomas's Exeter for 21 years. Kekewich died at the age of 76.

Family
In 1820, he married Agatha Maria Sophia Langston, daughter of John Langston of Sarsden Oxfordshire. His second son was the noted judge Sir Arthur Kekewich; his eldest son Trehawke Kekewich was the father of his grandsons, Sir Trehawke Herbert Kekewich, 1st Baronet and Major General Robert Kekewich.

In 1840, he married secondly, to Louisa Buck, daughter of Lewis William Buck (1784-1858) of Moreton House, Bideford, and Hartland Abbey, Devon, Member of Parliament for Exeter 1826-32 and for North Devon  1839–57. By this marriage, he was the father of George William Kekewich.

References

External links

1796 births
1873 deaths
Tory MPs (pre-1834)
UK MPs 1820–1826
UK MPs 1826–1830
Conservative Party (UK) MPs for English constituencies
English justices of the peace
UK MPs 1857–1859
UK MPs 1859–1865
UK MPs 1865–1868
UK MPs 1868–1874
People educated at Eton College
Alumni of Christ Church, Oxford
Deputy Lieutenants of Devon
High Sheriffs of Devon
Members of the Parliament of the United Kingdom for Exeter
Members of the Parliament of the United Kingdom for South Devon